Bjørn Skagestad (born 5 September 1950) is a Norwegian actor.

Selected filmography
 1980: Life and Death
 1981: Martin
 1981: The Witch Hunt
 1992: Lakki

References

1950 births
Norwegian male film actors
Living people